The Kazakhstan Hockey Cup is the national ice hockey cup in Kazakhstan. It was first played in 2002. Kazzinc-Torpedo has won the most cups, with four, Kazakhmys Satpaev/Karagandy has won three, Saryarka Karaganda, Arlan Kokshetau, Gornyak Rudny and Kulager Petropavl have all won two respectively, Yertis Pavlodar, Arystan Temirtau and Altay Torpedo have both won one apiece.

Winners 

 2021: Saryarka Karaganda
 2020: Saryarka Karaganda (delayed to Feb 2021 due to Covid 19)
 2019: Altay Torpedo
 2018: Altay Torpedo
 2017: Kulager Petropavl
 2016: Kulager Petropavl
 2015: Gornyak Rudny
 2014: Yertis Pavlodar
 2013: Arlan Kokshetau
 2012: Arlan Kokshetau
 2011: Arystan Temirtau
 2010: Gornyak Rudny
 2009: No event
 2008: Kazakhmys Satpaev
 2007: Kazzinc-Torpedo
 2006: Kazakhmys Satpaev
 2005: Kazakhmys Karagandy
 2004: Kazzinc-Torpedo
 2003: Kazzinc-Torpedo
 2002: Kazzinc-Torpedo

See also
Kazakhstan Hockey Championship

External links
 Kazakhstan Ice Hockey Federation

  
Cup
National ice hockey cup competitions in Europe